East Zhoupu is a station on Line 16 of the Shanghai Metro.

References

Railway stations in Shanghai
Line 16, Shanghai Metro
Shanghai Metro stations in Pudong
Railway stations in China opened in 2013